Milan Gombala (born 29 January 1968 in Lučenec) is a retired Czech long jumper, best known for his silver medal at the 1994 European Championships. His personal best is 8.04 metres, achieved in August 1995 in Linz.

International competitions

1No mark in the final

External links

1968 births
Living people
People from Lučenec
Sportspeople from the Banská Bystrica Region
Czech male long jumpers
Czechoslovak male long jumpers
Olympic athletes of Czechoslovakia
Athletes (track and field) at the 1992 Summer Olympics
Olympic athletes of the Czech Republic
Athletes (track and field) at the 1996 Summer Olympics
World Athletics Championships athletes for the Czech Republic
World Athletics Championships athletes for Czechoslovakia
European Athletics Championships medalists